Koltsovo was an urban-type settlement under jurisdiction of Oktyabrsky City District of Yekaterinburg, Russia.  Since 2005, Koltsovo is a part of Yekaterinburg.

Koltsovo International Airport is located nearby.

Urban-type settlements in Sverdlovsk Oblast